Aethes deutschiana is a moth of the family Tortricidae. It was described by Zetterstedt in 1839. It is found in south-eastern France, Italy, Switzerland, Austria, Norway, Sweden, northern Finland, Karelia, Bulgaria, Russia (Usgent, Altai, Alai, Sajan, Munko-Sardyk), Armenia, Iran, Japan and North America.

Adults are on wing from April to August in western Europe.

References

deutschiana
Moths described in 1839
Moths of Europe
Moths of Asia
Moths of North America